, better known by her ring name , is a Japanese professional wrestler. She is currently signed to World Wonder Ring Stardom.

Professional wrestling career

Independent circuit (2015–present)

Maki wrestled a couple of matches for Reina, one of them at REINA Year End Battle In Korakuen 2015 on December 26, where she teamed up with Tae Honma in a losing effort to Saori Anou and her trainer Yuna Manase. She participated at Kyoko Kimura Retirement Produce Last Afro on January 22, 2017, where she competed in a 20-man battle royal also involving other popular superstars such as Takashi Sasaki, Munenori Sawa, Yuki Miyazaki, Yuko Miyamoto, Hercules Senga and others. While competing in All Japan Pro Wrestling, she participated at the AJPW Jun Akiyama & Takao Omori 25th Anniversary event from October 21, 2017, where she teamed up with Saori Anou, picking up a victory against Haruka Kato and Saki. At Oz Academy's AKINO Produce 20th Anniversary, an event from on July 8, 2018 which portraited the 20th career anniversary of Mika Akino, she fell short to Mayumi Ozaki. Maki wrestled for DDT Pro-Wrestling at Wrestle Peter Pan 2019 on July 15, where she teamed up with Unagi Sayaka and Yuna Manase in a losing effort to Rika Tatsumi and The Bakuretsu Sisters (Nodoka Tenma and Yuki Aino). She once competed for Sendai Girls' Pro Wrestling, at a house show which took place on February 16, 2020, where she teamed up with Sareee in a losing effort to Dash Chisako and Meiko Satomura.

JWP Joshi Puroresu (2016–2017)
One of her appearances in JWP Joshi Puroresu was at JWP Pure Dream 2016 on November 3, where she unsuccessfully challenged Hana Kimura for both JWP Junior Championship and Princess of Pro Wrestling Championship. At JWP Fly High In The 25th Anniversary Party on April 2, 2017, Maki competed in a 17-woman battle royal, facing notable opponents such as Kayoko Haruyama, Yumiko Hotta, Jaguar Yokota and Command Bolshoi.

Tokyo Joshi Pro Wrestling (2019–2020)
Maki also competed in Tokyo Joshi Pro Wrestling, promotion for which she made her debut at TJPW Tokyo Joshi Pro '19 on January 4, 2019, where she teamed up with Millie McKenzie, falling short to Bakuretsu Sisters (Nodoka Tenma and Yuki Aino). She made sporadic notable appearances such as at TJPW Pinano Pipipipi Graduation Special where she competed in a gauntlet battle royal also involving the winner Hikari Noa, Yuka Sakazaki, Shoko Nakajima and Mizuki. At TJPW Yes! Wonderland 2019 on May 3, Maki teamed up with Hikari Noa to unsuccessfully challenge Mizuki and Yuka Sakazaki for the Princess Tag Team Championship. The most notable match she had in the promotion was at TJPW Brand New Wrestling 3 from August 25, 2019 where she defeated Gisele Shaw for the vacant International Princess Championship. Maki resigned from TJPW on September 21, 2020, leaving for Stardom.

World Wonder Ring Stardom (2016, 2020–present)
Maki made her debut in World Wonder Ring Stardom on the fifth night of the Stardom 5th Anniversary which took place on February 21, 2016, where she teamed up with Saori Anou and Starlight Kid, getting defeated by Azumi, Haruka Kato and Kaori Yoneyama in a six-man tag team match. She scored a notable work in the 5STAR Grand Prix 2016 Tournament starting with August 21, placing herself in the Block A, competing against Hiromi Mimura, Kay Lee Ray, Mayu Iwatani, Yoko Bito, Toni Storm and Blue Nikita.

Maki had a four-year hiatus with the promotion until her return at Stardom Yokohama Cinderella on October 3, 2020, where she defeated Death-yama san and was revealed to be the newest recruit of the Donna Del Mondo stable led by Giulia. 

At Stardom 10th Anniversary Show on January 17, Maki defeated Konami in a singles match. At Stardom Nippon Budokan Great Eve on January 31, 2021, she teamed up with Himeka to unsuccessfully challenge Oedo Tai's Bea Priestley and Konami for the Goddess of Stardom Championship. At  Maki took part in a 20-woman battle royal at Stardom New Year Stars 2021 from February 21, also involving Utami Hayashishita, Saya Iida, Momo Watanabe, Natsuko Tora and the winner Ruaka. Maki won her first title in the promotion, the High Speed Championship at the 10th Anniversary Of Stardom from March 3, 2021 where she defeated AZM. At Stardom Yokohama Dream Cinderella 2021 from April 4, she unsuccessfully challenged Tam Nakano for the Wonder of Stardom Championship. On the first night of the Stardom Cinderella Tournament 2021 from April 10, Maki fell short to fellow stablemate Syuri in a Cinderella Tournament First-round match. At Stardom 5 Star Grand Prix 2021, Maki fought in the "Red Stars" block where she scored a total of 9 points after competing against Momo Watanabe, Mayu Iwatani, Koguma, Starlight Kid, Himeka, Fukigen Death, Giulia, Mina Shirakawa and Saki Kashima. At Stardom in Nagoya on October 3, 2021, Maki teamed up with Donna Del Mondo stablemates Maika and Himeka to defeat Cosmic Angels (Tam Nakano, Mina Shirakawa and Unagi Sayaka) for the Artist of Stardom Championship. At Stardom 10th Anniversary Grand Final Osaka Dream Cinderella on October 9, they scored the first successful defense by defeating Queen's Quest (Momo Watanabe, AZM and Saya Kamitani). At Kawasaki Super Wars, the first event of the Stardom Super Wars trilogy which took place on November 3, 2021, Maki teamed up with Himeka and went into a time-limit draw against Mayu Iwatani and Koguma. At Tokyo Super Wars on November 27, she fell short to Saya Kamitani and Himeka in a three-way match to determine the number one contender for the Wonder of Stardom Championship. At Osaka Super Wars, the last event from December 18, Maki teamed up with Maika and Himeka and took part in a ¥10 Million Unit Tournament which was also contested for the Artist of Stardom Championship by first defeating Marvelous (Takumi Iroha, Rin Kadokura and Maria) in the semi finals, and eventually Mayu Iwatani, Hazuki and Koguma in the finals on the same night as a result of a Six-woman tag team ladder match to both retain the titles and win the money prize. At Stardom Dream Queendom on December 29, 2022, Maki alongside Maika and Himeka defended the titles again against Cosmic Angels (Mina Shirakawa, Unagi Sayaka and Mai Sakurai).

At Stardom Cinderella Journey on February 23, 2022, Maki unsuccessfully challenged Saya Kamitani for the Wonder of Stardom Championship. On the first night of the Stardom World Climax 2022 from March 26, Maki teamed up with Himeka and Mai Sakurai and defeated Queen's Quest (AZM, Lady C & Miyu Amasaki), Cosmic Angels (Waka Tsukiyama & Mina Shirakawa) & Momo Kohgo, and Oedo Tai (Saki Kashima, Fukigen Death & Ruaka) in a Six-woman tag team gauntlet match. On the second night from March 27, she unsuccessfully challenged AZM and Koguma for the High Speed Championship. At Stardom Cinderella Tournament 2022, Maki made in to he semifinals from April 29 where she fell short to Mirai. At Stardom Golden Week Fight Tour on May 5, 2022, sje teamed up with Giulia, Himeka and Mai Sakurai in a losing effort against God's Eye (Syuri, Mirai, Ami Sourei and Konami). At Stardom Flashing Champions on May 28, 2022, Maki, Himeka and Maika dropped the Artist of Stardom Championship to Oedo Tai (Saki Kashima, Momo Watanabe and Starlight Kid). At Stardom Fight in the Top on June 26, 2022, Maki unsuccessfully challenged Tam Nakano in a Steel cage match. At Mid Summer Champions in Tokyo, the first event of the Stardom Mid Summer Champions series which took place on July 9, 2022, Maki teamed up with Donna Del Mondo stablemates Giulia, Maika, Himeka and Mai Sakurai to face Cosmic Angels (Tam Nakano, Unagi Sayaka, Mina Shirakawa, Saki and Hikari Shimizu) in a 10-woman elimination tag team match. Maki betrayed Donna Del Mondo by attacking Giulia mid-match, attracting the latter's unit loss. She subsequently joined Cosmic Angels in the process. At the Stardom 5 Star Grand Prix 2022, Maki fought in the "Blue Goddess" block where she scored a total of 12 points after going against Giulia, Mirai, Mayu Iwatani, Suzu Suzuki, Hazuki, Saya Kamitani, Starlight Kid, Momo Watanabe, Ami Sourei, Mina Shirakawa, Saya Iida and Hanan. At Stardom x Stardom: Nagoya Midsummer Encounter, Maki teamed up with Tam Nakano and defeated Hazuki and Koguma to win the Goddess of Stardom Championship. At Stardom in Showcase vol.2 on September 25, 2022, Maki and Nakano fought Saki & Hikari Shimizu and Mina Shirakawa & Unagi Sayaka into a no contest as a result of a comedic Cosmic Rule Three-Way Match.

New Japan Pro Wrestling (2021–present)
On January 5, 2021, in the second night of New Japan Pro Wrestling's Wrestle Kingdom 15, Maki teamed up with Maika and Himeka competing in an exhibition match, losing to Queen's Quest (AZM, Saya Kamitani and Utami Hayashishita).

Championships and accomplishments
 Pro Wrestling Illustrated
 Ranked No. 55 of the top 150 female wrestlers in the PWI Women's 150 in 2022
Tokyo Joshi Pro Wrestling
International Princess Championship (1 time, inaugural)
World Wonder Ring Stardom
High Speed Championship (1 time)
Artist of Stardom Championship (1 time) – with Himeka and Maika
Goddess of Stardom Championship (1 time) – with Tam Nakano
¥10,000,000 Unit Tournament (2021) – with Himeka and Maika
 Stardom Year-End Award (2 times)
 Best Unit Award (2020) 
 Best Tag Team Award (2022) – with Tam Nakano

References 

1995 births
Living people
Sportspeople from Yokohama
Japanese female professional wrestlers
21st-century professional wrestlers
Goddess of Stardom Champions
Artist of Stardom Champions
High Speed Champions